Theodore Roosevelt, Fighting Patriot  is a children's book by Clara Ingram Judson, about Theodore Roosevelt. 

1953 children's books
Children's history books
American children's books
Books about Theodore Roosevelt
Newbery Honor-winning works